The 1998–99 Princeton Tigers men's basketball team represented the Princeton University in intercollegiate college basketball during the 1998–99 NCAA Division I men's basketball season. The head coach was Bill Carmody and the team co-captains were Brian Earl and Gabe Lewullis. The team played its home games in the Jadwin Gymnasium on the University campus in Princeton, New Jersey, and was the runner-up of the Ivy League.  The team earned an invitation to the 32-team 1999 National Invitation Tournament.

Using the Princeton offense, the team had a midseason eleven-game winning streak and posted a 22–8 overall record and an 11–3 conference record. On March 10, the team came back from a 23-point half time deficit and a 27-point deficit with 15:11 remaining against the Penn Quakers to win 50–49. , the 27-point comeback from 13–40 with 15:11 remaining to win 50–49 over Penn on February 9, 1999, remains the fifth-largest comeback and fourth-largest second-half comeback in NCAA history. That game's 9–33 half time deficit comeback remains the second-largest comeback.

The team was led by All-Ivy League first team selections Lewullis and Earl, who won the Ivy League Men's Basketball Player of the Year, as well as Ivy League Men's Basketball Rookie of the Year Chris Young. The team won the eleventh of twelve consecutive national statistical championships in scoring defense with a 52.7 points allowed average. Earl ended his Princeton career as the Ivy League's all-time three-point field goal with 281, surpassing Matt Maloney's 244.  The total continues to be the all-time record.  He also achieved a 90.9% free throw percentage in conference games to earn the Ivy League statistical championship.

References

Princeton Tigers men's basketball seasons
Princeton Tigers
Princeton
Prince
Prince